Big Brass is an album by trumpeter Benny Bailey featuring performances recorded in late 1960 and originally released on the Candid label.

Reception

Ken Dryden of Allmusic says, "Big Brass marks one of trumpeter Benny Bailey's earliest efforts as a leader, but it is also one of the best releases of his career. ...The entire session has a relaxed air, as if old friends got together to play some well-rehearsed material, so it is warmly recommended".

Track listing
 "Hard Sock Dance" (Quincy Jones) - 5:47
 "Alison" (Hale Smith) - 6:46
 "Tipsy" (Oliver Nelson) - 6:54
 "Please Say Yes" (Tom McIntosh) - 5:58
 "A Kiss to Build a Dream On" (Bert Kalmar, Harry Ruby, Oscar Hammerstein II) - 8:03
 "Maud's Mood" (Benny Bailey) - 6:25

Personnel
Benny Bailey - trumpet
Julius Watkins - French horn (tracks 1, 4 & 6)
Phil Woods - alto saxophone, bass clarinet (tracks 1, 4 & 6)
Les Spann - guitar, flute
Tommy Flanagan - piano
Buddy Catlett - bass
Art Taylor - drums

References

Candid Records albums
Benny Bailey albums
1960 albums
Albums produced by Nat Hentoff